Charles Garnier, S.J., (baptised at Paris, May 25, 1606 – December 7, 1649) was a Jesuit missionary working in New France. He was killed by Iroquois in a Petun (Tobacco Nation) village on December 7, 1649.

Biography
The son of a secretary to King Henri III of France, Garnier was born in Paris in 1606. He attended the Collège de Clermont in Paris and joined the Jesuit seminary in Clermont in September 1624.

After his novitiate, he returned to the College of Clermont as Prefect. After finishing his studies in rhetoric and philosophy, he spent two years teaching at the College of Eu as a teacher. Completing years of studies in language, culture and theology, he was ordained as a priest in 1635. His father initially forbade him from travelling to Canada where he would face almost certain death as a missionary, but he was eventually allowed to go. Embarking on March 25, 1636, he described the crossing in a letter to his father,

We gave Viaticum to a sailor who had fallen from the top of the mizzenmast to the deck. He was well-disposed to die. However, as I saw him in great discomfort, unable to sleep, I gave him my cabin and went in with Father Chastelain in his, but the sick man found this cabin too stuffy so the next day I occupied it again but left him my mattress so he could sleep even in the midst of the cannons. Hearing this, the Captain made me take one of his.

He reached the colony of New France in June. He travelled immediately to the Huron mission with fellow Jesuit Pierre Chastellain. By early August he had arrived among the Nipissings.

He served for the rest of his life as a missionary among the Huron, never returning to France. The Huron nicknamed him Ouracha, or "rain-giver", after his arrival was followed by a drought-ending rainfall. He was greatly influenced by fellow missionary Jean de Brébeuf, and was known as the "lamb" to Brebeuf's "lion". In 1639 and 1640 he wintered in the land of the Petun. From 1641 to 1646 Garnier was at the Saint-Joseph mission.

There were raids between Iroquois and Huron forces. When he learned that Brébeuf and Lalemant were killed in March 1649 by Iroquois after a raid on a Huron village, Garnier knew he too might soon die. On December 7, 1649, he was killed by musket fire from the Iroquois during an attack on the Petun village where he was living.

Charles Garnier was canonized in 1930 by Pope Pius XI with the other seven Canadian Martyrs (also known as the North American Martyrs.) His feast day is October 19.

See also
 Shrine of the North American Martyrs

References

Bibliography 
 
 "De la prise et désolation de la mission de Saint-Jean, par les Iroquois, et de la mort du P. Charles Garnier, qui y était en mission" and "Abrégé de la vie du Père Charles Garnier," in ACSM, "Mémoires touchant la mort et les vertus des pères Isaac Jogues . . ." (Ragueneau), repr. APQ Rapport, 1924–25, 76–85. 
 APQ Rapport, 1929–30, 1–43, "Lettres de Saint Charles Garnier." JR (Thwaites), XXXV, 118–44; et passim. Positio causae. 
 Florian Larivière, La vie ardente de Saint Charles Garnier (Montréal, 1957). 
 Rochemonteix, Les Jésuites et la Nouvelle-France au XVIIe siècle, I, 97–100, 409–18.

1606 births
1649 deaths
Jesuit martyrs
Jesuit saints
Roman Catholic missionaries in Canada
Canadian clergy
17th-century French Jesuits
Canadian Roman Catholic saints
French Roman Catholic saints
17th-century Christian saints
17th-century Roman Catholic martyrs
French Roman Catholic missionaries
Jesuit missionaries in New France